ST-1936 (2-methyl-5-chloro-N,N-dimethyltryptamine) is a tryptamine derivative which is used in scientific research. It acts as a selective 5-HT6 receptor agonist, with a Ki of 13 nM, and much weaker action at 5-HT2B and 5-HT7 subtypes. In animal studies it has been found to increase dopamine and noradrenaline mediated signalling but decreases glutamatergic transmission, and has antidepressant effects.

See also 
 EMD-386,088
 EMDT
 5-Bromo-DMT
 5-Chloro-AMT

References 

5-HT6 agonists
Tryptamines
Chloroarenes